Alfonso Serrano "Alfie" Anido (December 30, 1959 – December 30, 1981) was a popular Filipino matinee idol, best remembered for his mysterious sudden death at the age of 22.

Biography
Anido was born on December 30, 1959, in Manila. He was the eldest of the four children of Alberto Anido and Sarah Serrano, both Spanish Mestizo. He was also the brother of Albert Anido, another Filipino actor. He was also a fashion and commercial model before he became a contract star for Regal Films, a leading Filipino film production company. He was dubbed as one of the Regal Babies, along with then-young actors such as Gabby Concepcion, William Martinez, Albert Martinez, Maricel Soriano, Snooky Serna, and Dina Bonnevie. He was famously linked with Bonnevie, his co-star in the 1980 camp classic Temptation Island. At the time of his entry into show business, he was in college at the Ateneo de Manila University studying management.

Death
Anido died on December 30, 1981, the night of his 22nd birthday at his home in Bel-Air, Makati. The official version, contemporaneously reported in the mainstream Manila media, was that Anido had been shot. This version has not been officially or authoritatively contradicted up to this day. However, immediately after his death, rumors quickly spread that Anido was actually murdered, and that such fact was covered up owing to the prominence of the personalities allegedly involved. Suspicion fell on the family of an ex-girlfriend whose father was a high-ranking government official, Minister of Defense Juan Ponce Enrile. The rumor gained traction in Manila, which was then under Ferdinand Marcos, whose government is against Lopez's  and other oligarchs controlled mass media during that period. Jack Enrile, the brother of Anido's then girlfriend Katrina Enrile, was rumored to have shot Anido but has denied any involvement in the actor's death.

Other versions on the death of Anido were printed in the alternative press such as the Philippine Collegian, the official student organ of the University of the Philippines.

Filmography

Film
 1980: Nympha – introducing role as Marcial (movie released March 7, 1980)
 1980: Uhaw sa Kalayaan – Arman (movie released June 6, 1980)
 1980: Temptation Island – Alfredo (movie released July 4, 1980)
 1980: Katorse – Albert (movie released July 25, 1980)
 1980: Waikiki: Sa Lupa ng Ating mga Pangarap – Ronald (movie released November 14, 1980)
 1981: Bilibid Boys – Steve Guanzon (movie released January 16, 1981)
 1981: Blue Jeans – Joey Amador (movie released February 20, 1981)
 1981: Pabling – cameo role as Fredo "The Bus Conductor" (movie released July 17, 1981)
 1981: Bilibid Gays – guest role (movie released July 31, 1981)
 1981: Kasalanan Ba? – Benjie (movie released October 2, 1981)
 1982: Throw Away Child – Atty. Delfin Llamzon (movie posthumously released January 8, 1982)
 1982: Dormitoryo – Philip (the only non-Regal movie that starred Anido; movie posthumously released January 15, 1982)
 1982: Diosa – Jun Alegre (movie posthumously released August 13, 1982)
 1982: The Diary of Cristina Gaston – Alfredo (movie posthumously released September 24, 1982)

References

External links
 

1959 births
1981 deaths
Filipino people of Spanish descent
Ateneo de Manila University alumni
20th-century Filipino male actors
Burials at the Manila Memorial Park – Sucat
Filipino male film actors
Deaths by firearm in the Philippines